Early and indirect presidential elections were held in Finland in 1940 after President Kyösti Kallio resigned on 27 November following a stroke on 27 August. The 1937 electoral college was recalled and elected Prime Minister Risto Ryti, who received 288 of the 300 votes.  Most other Finnish politicians considered Ryti a principled, unselfish, intelligent and patriotic man, who could lead Finland effectively enough during World War II.  His leadership qualities had been tested already during the Winter War (November 1939–March 1940).  Also the outgoing President Kallio considered him the best available presidential candidate.  In early December 1940, the Soviet Foreign Minister, Vyacheslav Molotov, interfered with the Finnish presidential elections by claiming to the Finnish Ambassador to the Soviet Union, Juho Kusti Paasikivi, that if potential presidential candidates such as Marshal Carl Gustaf Emil Mannerheim, former President Pehr Evind Svinhufvud, or former Prime Minister Toivo Mikael Kivimäki were elected President, the Soviet government would consider Finland unwilling to fulfill its peace treaty with the Soviet Union.  Due to the lingering threat of another war and the Karelian refugees' dispersal throughout Finland, regular presidential elections were cancelled, and instead the 1937 presidential electors were summoned to elect the President.  Under these tense political circumstances, Ryti had no problem winning these exceptional presidential elections by a landslide. The same day, former president Kallio died.

Results

References

Presidential elections in Finland
President